The 2015–16 Houston Cougars men's basketball team represented the University of Houston during the 2015–16 NCAA Division I men's basketball season. The Cougars were led by second year head coach Kelvin Sampson and were members of the American Athletic Conference. The Cougars played their home games at Hofheinz Pavilion. They finished the season with a record of 22–11, 12–6 in AAC play to finish in a tie for third place in conference. They lost in the quarterfinals of the AAC tournament to Tulane. They received a bid to the National Invitation Tournament where they lost to Georgia Tech in the first round.

Previous season 
The Cougars finished the 2014–15 season with a record of 13–19, 4–14 in AAC play to finish in tenth place in conference. They advanced to the quarterfinals of the AAC tournament where they lost to Tulsa.

Departures

Incoming Transfers

Class of 2015 signees

Roster

Schedule and results

|-
!colspan=12 style="background:#CC0000; color:white;"| Exhibition

|-
!colspan=12 style="background:#CC0000; color:white;"| Non-conference regular season

|-
!colspan=12 style="background:#CC0000; color:white;"| AAC regular season

|-
!colspan=12 style="background:#CC0000; color:white;"| American Athletic Conference tournament

|-
!colspan=12 style="background:#CC0000; color:white;"| NIT

Rankings

References

Houston
Houston Cougars men's basketball seasons
Houston
Houston
Houston